Honoré de Marseille is a 1956 French comedy film by Maurice Régamey.

Plot
The story begins in 600 BC with the landing in a calque of a Phocéenne galley commanded by the warrior Honorius who, married by mistake the daughter of the Ligurian king, will found the city of Marseille. Honor, the first Marseilles, gives way to Honorius to tell us the hero-comic adventures of the siege of Marseille by the legions of Julius Caesar, which will lead to the invention of the petanque. Through successive leaps over the centuries, and in songs, Honoré tells us the history of the city of Phocea.

Cast
 Fernandel : Honoris, Honorius, Honoré
 Andrex : Pastèque
 Francis Blanche : Pasquale Marchetti
 Yvonne Monlaur : Gyptis
 Michel Etcheverry : Bob Patrick
 Edmond Ardisson : Victor
 Henri Crémieux : Garrigues
 Rellys : Saturnin

Songs
Songs composed by Henri Betti with lyrics by Jean Manse and performed by Fernandel with an orchestration by Paul Bonneau : Quel Plaisir ! Quel Travail !, Tout ça c'est Marseille, Oh ! Honoré and C'est Noël.

Production
The song C'est Noël was sung in a scene that was cut at the editing. It was later sung by Tino Rossi and Georges Guétary.

External links

1956 films
French comedy films
1950s French films
1956 comedy films